The Class BB 67200 diesel locomotives of SNCF were adapted from BB 67000 locomotives.

History
With the opening of the LGV Sud-Est, thirty BB 67000 class locomotives were fitted with cab signalling and radio to operate ballast trains and for use in an emergency on the high speed lines. For the latter purpose they were fitted with a Scharfenberg coupler at one end to enable them to be attached to a TGV rake. Initially the class was based at Nevers. A further 50 locomotives were subsequently converted.

References

67200
67200
B-B locomotives
BB 67200
Standard gauge locomotives of France

 
Rebuilt locomotives